Khaldieh is a village in Miniyeh-Danniyeh District, in the Northern Governorate of Lebanon. Its population is Maronite Catholic.

External links
Ehden Family Tree

Populated places in Miniyeh-Danniyeh District
Populated places in Lebanon